Dennis Allen Mitchell (born February 20, 1966) is an American former college and international track and field athlete, who was a member of the gold medal-winning team in the 4 x 100 meters relay race at the 1992 Summer Olympics.

Athletic career
Mitchell was born in Havelock, North Carolina.  He received an athletic scholarship to attend the University of Florida in Gainesville, Florida, where he ran for the Florida Gators track and field team in National Collegiate Athletic Association (NCAA) and Southeastern Conference (SEC) competition from 1986 to 1989.  At Florida, Mitchell was coached by Joe Walker.  Mitchell placed fourth in the 100 meters race at the 1988 Summer Olympics and missed a probable gold medal in the 4 x 100 meters relay race, because the American team was disqualified in the early heats, after the baton pass between teammates Calvin Smith and Lee McNeill was completed outside the exchange zone.  In 1989, Mitchell won the NCAA championships in 200 meters race, and he was inducted into the University of Florida Athletic Hall of Fame as a "Gator Great" in 2005.

In 1991, just a month before the World Championships, Mitchell set his first world record in the 4 x 100 meters relay of 37.67 at Zürich. At the World Championships, Mitchell was again a member of the American 4 x 100 meters relay team, in which he set a new world record of 37.50 in the final. Mitchell also won a bronze medal in the individual 100 meters race, just 0.01 seconds shy of the world record.

In 1992, Mitchell won his first United States National Championships title in the 100 meters (he repeated this victory in 1994 and 1996). At the Barcelona Olympics, Mitchell ran his third world record in 4 x 100 meters relay of 37.40 and won again a bronze medal in the 100 meters race.

At the 1993 World Championships, Mitchell won his third bronze at the international championships in individual 100 meters and his third gold in relay event with a world record, as this time the American team equaled their own world record of 37.40.

Mitchell won a gold medal in 100 meters at the 1994 Goodwill Games, but injured himself in the heats of 100 -meters at the 1995 World Championships. At the 1996 Summer Olympics, Mitchell was fourth in 100-meters and won a silver medal as a member of the second-place U.S. 4x100-meters relay team.

His personal best for the 100 metres was 9.91 seconds, set in Tokyo on 25 August 1991 in the World Athletics Championships final.

Personal life
Mitchell is married to Damu Cherry-Mitchell, an Olympian in the 100-meter hurdles, and has four children. He coaches his own club, Star Athletics, in Montverde, Florida. He has trained world class athletes including Sha'Carri Richardson, Kenny Bednarek, Justin Gatlin, Aaron Brown, Kaylin Whitney, and Javianne Oliver among others.

Doping history
In 1998, Mitchell was banned by International Association of Athletics Federations for two years after a test showed high levels of testosterone. They did not accept his defense of "five bottles of beer and sex with his wife at least four times... it was her birthday, the lady deserved a treat." Mitchell made his final international appearance at the 2001 World Championships, where his team finished first in the 4 x 100 meters relay, but was subsequently disqualified because of BALCO scandal involvement by a teammate.

On May 1, 2008, it was announced that the U.S. government, in its trial against Trevor Graham, would have Mitchell, as well as Antonio Pettigrew as witnesses, with Mitchell to testify that Graham injected him with human growth hormone.

See also

 Florida Gators
 List of Olympic medalists in athletics (men)
 List of University of Florida Olympians
List of University of Florida Athletic Hall of Fame members

References

External links
 Masters T&F 100 metres Dash All-Time Rankings  10.11 (2001)
 Masters T&F 200 metres Dash All-Time Rankings  20.45 (2001)

1966 births
Living people
American male sprinters
Athletes (track and field) at the 1988 Summer Olympics
Athletes (track and field) at the 1992 Summer Olympics
Athletes (track and field) at the 1996 Summer Olympics
Doping cases in athletics
Florida Gators men's track and field athletes
Olympic bronze medalists for the United States in track and field
Olympic gold medalists for the United States in track and field
Olympic silver medalists for the United States in track and field
People from Havelock, North Carolina
World Athletics Championships medalists
Medalists at the 1996 Summer Olympics
Medalists at the 1992 Summer Olympics
Goodwill Games medalists in athletics
USA Outdoor Track and Field Championships winners
USA Indoor Track and Field Championships winners
World Athletics Championships winners
Competitors at the 1998 Goodwill Games
Competitors at the 1990 Goodwill Games
Competitors at the 1994 Goodwill Games